Henriciella aquimarina is a bacterium from the genus of Henriciella which has been isolated from deep seawater from the Indian Ocean.

References 

Caulobacterales
Bacteria described in 2011